Landaff may refer to:

 Landaff, New Hampshire, a town in Grafton County
 Landaff Andrews (1803–1888), United States Representative from Kentucky
 Earl Landaff, a title in the Peerage of Ireland
 Francis Mathew, 1st Earl Landaff (1738–1806)
 Francis Mathew, 2nd Earl Landaff (1768–1833)

See also
 
 Landulf, a masculine given name
 Llandaff, a district, community and electoral ward in Cardiff, Wales, United Kingdom